Diaphus brachycephalus, the short-headed lantern fish, is a species of lanternfish 
found worldwide.

Size

References

Myctophidae
Taxa named by Åge Vedel Tåning
Fish described in 1932